This is a list of some of the many webcomics featuring lesbian, gay, bisexual, transgender, or otherwise LGBTQ content.

LGBTQ+ themes and characters were historically omitted intentionally from the content of comic strips and comic books, due to either censorship, the perception that LGBTQ+ representation was inappropriate for children, or the perception that comics as a medium were for children. In recent years, the number of LGBTQ+ characters in mainstream comics has increased greatly. There exist a large amount of openly gay and lesbian comic creators that self-publish their work on the Internet. These include amateur works, as well as more "mainstream" works, such as Kyle's Bed & Breakfast. According to Andrew Wheeler from Comics Alliance, webcomics "provide a platform to so many queer voices that might otherwise go undiscovered."

1980s–1990s

2000s

2000–2004

2005–2009

2010s

2010–2014

2015–2019

2020s

See also
LGBT themes in comics
LGBT themes in American mainstream comics
Lists of LGBT figures in fiction and myth
List of graphic art works with LGBT characters

Notes

References

 
 
 
LGBT
Lists of LGBT fictional characters